Janospira is a microfossil known from Ordovician deposits, whose affinity is uncertain. It resembles a spiral shell mounted on a cylinder, probably calcareous, about 1 mm in length.  There are compelling reasons to discount a foramaniferan or molluscan affinity, though, some researchers presume it to be an archaeogastropod.

Species of Janospira are known from northern Spitsbergen, Norway, and from Australia

References

Enigmatic prehistoric animal genera